Stanley Paul Young (October 31, 1889May 15, 1969) was an American biologist who spent forty-two years working for the U.S. government in several departments which dealt with wildlife management and research. Also known as an author and ecologist, his primary interests were the predatory mammals of the American West: the wolf, coyote, puma or cougar, and bobcat.

Early life and education
Young was born in Astoria, Oregon, to Benjamin and Christine Young. He attended the University of Oregon, graduating with a BA in mining engineering in 1911. After working for three years as a mining engineer, he decided to change careers and enrolled at the University of Michigan, earning a master's degree in biology. In an interview in 1961, Young said, "As a boy I earned pin money trapping coon and mink near the mouth of the Columbia. I had a deep interest in animal life. It was this interest that made me decide to become a biologist."

Career
In 1917, Young was hired as a ranger by the U. S. Forest Service in Arizona; a few months later he was working as a hunter of predatory mammals for the Bureau of Biological Survey. 

Young continued to work in predatory animal control in the West until 1927, when he moved to Washington, D.C., to become the assistant head of the Division of Predatory Animal and Rodent Control. Young held a number of positions in the Biological Survey. When the Survey was transferred to the Department of Interior in 1939, Young was made senior biologist in the Branch of Wildlife Research, and devoted his career to research.

In 1957, Young was named Director of the Bird and Mammal Laboratories, where he remained until his retirement in 1959. The Department of the Interior awarded him its Distinguished Service Award, the highest honor the agency can bestow.

Bibliography

Notes

References

Sources

External links

 Stanley P. Young Papers at the Harry Ransom Center, University of Texas at Austin.

1889 births
1969 deaths
University of Michigan alumni
University of Oregon alumni
People from Astoria, Oregon